Muggendorf is a village in municipality Wiesenttal in Franconian Switzerland, Bavaria, Germany.

Geography 
The village is located on the river Wiesent 304 m above mean sea level.

Villages in Bavaria
Wiesenttal